Hypolycaena lebona, the fairy hairstreak, is a butterfly in the family Lycaenidae. It is found in Sierra Leone, Liberia, Ivory Coast, Ghana, Togo, Nigeria, Cameroon, Gabon, the Republic of the Congo, the Central African Republic, the Democratic Republic of the Congo, Uganda and Tanzania. The habitat consists of forests.

Adults mud-puddle and have also been recorded imbibing moisture from moist wood ash.

The larvae have been recorded feeding on ewo (a word in the Yoruba language). They are associated with ants of the genus Pheidole, including P. aurivillii race kasaiensis. The larvae are deep green in colour.

Subspecies
Hypolycaena lebona lebona (Sierra Leone, Liberia, Ivory Coast, Ghana, Togo, Nigeria: south and the Cross River loop, Cameroon, Gabon, Congo, Central African Republic, Democratic Republic of the Congo)
Hypolycaena lebona davenporti Larsen, 1997 (eastern Democratic Republic of the Congo, Uganda, north-western Tanzania)

References

External links

Die Gross-Schmetterlinge der Erde 13: Die Afrikanischen Tagfalter. Plate XIII 67 a
Die Gross-Schmetterlinge der Erde 13: Die Afrikanischen Tagfalter. Plate XIII 68 b

Butterflies described in 1865
Hypolycaenini
Butterflies of Africa
Taxa named by William Chapman Hewitson